The Little Adventuress is a 1927 American silent comedy film directed by William C. deMille and starring Vera Reynolds, Phyllis Haver and Victor Varconi. It is based on the play The Dover Road by A.A. Milne.  A sound remake Where Sinners Meet was made in 1934.

The film's sets were by the art director Anton Grot, while the costumes were designed by Adrian.

Cast
 Vera Reynolds as Helen Davis 
 Phyllis Haver as Victoria Stoddard 
 Robert Ober as Leonard Stoddard 
 Theodore Kosloff as Antonio Russo 
 Victor Varconi as George La Fuente 
 Fred Walton as Dominick

References

Bibliography
 Goble, Alan. The Complete Index to Literary Sources in Film. Walter de Gruyter, 1999.

External links
 

1927 films
1927 comedy films
1920s English-language films
American silent feature films
Silent American comedy films
Films directed by William C. deMille
American black-and-white films
Producers Distributing Corporation films
1920s American films